is a professional wrestling fighting game that was developed by Yuke's and published by Konami for the PlayStation 2 in 2004. The game uses the same engine as Yuke's 2003 release WWE SmackDown! Here Comes the Pain. Rumble Roses was followed by Rumble Roses XX, released for the Xbox 360 in 2006.

Rumble Roses featured only female wrestling characters, each with both a good (Face) and bad (Heel) persona for players to choose from; the only limitation was that the good and bad version of the same character could not fight each other. The game featured 11 playable characters, each with two versions of the same character. It received lukewarm reviews, with most commending it for its graphics but being less impressed with the audio quality, game play and storyline.

Gameplay

Rumble Roses features an all-female cast. There are regular matches and mud wrestling matches. There is also a story mode and an option to allow two computer controlled girls to "duke it out while you watch". Each character is claimed to contain 10,000 polygons, a record number for the PlayStation 2.

Rumble Roses features a heel/face system derived from real-life American professional wrestling. Each character has an alternate side, bringing the total character count up to 22. Most characters start as a face, or good side. Three of them, however (Bloody Shadow, Candy Cane, and Evil Rose), start as the heel or evil side. Alternate forms of each character are unlocked through the Vow System. Vows are specific things the player must complete during matches, such as not using weapons, using a Killer Move, or winning the match within a certain time limit.

The game's unique unlock system allows only one version of each character (either heel or face) to be unlocked for exhibition matches at any time. The characters can still change back and forth, and unlocked characters remain open for story mode and gallery mode. This effectively cuts the roster in half for exhibition mode.

Plot

Story
A mad scientist disguised as a nurse holds an international women's wrestling tournament, and brainwashes and takes DNA samples from the participants to create super soldiers.

Wrestlers  
Each character has two versions, and each version has a unique sub-plot within Story Mode. The versions, dubbed "Face" or "Heel", have unique attires, names and move sets. It is not possible to use both Face and Heel variations of the same character in the same match. Most "Heel" characters have a matching tattoo on their body, which implies that they have been brain-washed by Anesthesia. The alternate characters have a much shorter story-mode:
 Aigle (Face) is a member of a nomadic minority living on the great plains of Mongolia. Her father and brother are grand champions in Mongolian wrestling. She also possesses the great strength of her father and brother. Aigle joined Rumble Roses in order to convince her father and brother that she is a great warrior. Somewhat lacking in self-esteem for her under-developed body, Aigle has a running gag of comparing the "teats" of the sheep she tended back home to those buxom women she faces in the ring.
Great Khan (Heel), also known as Killer Khan, is the alter ego of Aigle. Aigle didn't know that being a noble warrior would be a difficult path and began to make fouls in matches. She didn't go back home, thinking her father and brother would laugh at her. Aigle decided to become Great Khan and plans to conquer the world. Despite her decision, she still misses her father.
 Aisha (Face) is a highly successful money-making star who has won every contemporary Grammy available. Aisha is often rude to those she encounters, namely her rival Dixie Clemets.
 Sista A, (Heel) also known as Showbiz, is the alter ego of Aisha. After Rumble Roses, Aisha's record sales took a severe downfall, resulting in failure to make any money and soon being out of the business. However, Aisha still had a passion for dancing, and entered the Rumble Roses tournament just to dance on the stage.
 Anesthesia (Face) is a mysterious self-appointed nurse who serves as Lady X's assistant. She is particularly gifted at complicated submission moves. It is implied that she works for a hidden mastermind.
 Dr. Anesthesia (Heel), also known as Dr. Cutter, is the alter ego of Anesthesia. This is Anesthesia when operating. It is also the mastermind that Anesthesia pretends to work for. She wears a surgical mask to conceal her identity, although removes it for Mud Matches. After her project with Lady X went horribly wrong, Anesthesia became Dr. Anesthesia, with hopes of rebuilding Lady X and improving her, as well as getting revenge on those who defeated her and turn them into the so-called donors of the Lady X Project then turning them into an unbeatable army of cyborgs and experiments.
 Benikage (Heel), also known by her code name Bloody Shadow, is a female ninja wrestler working undercover for the Japanese government to investigate the Rumble Roses organization.
 Yasha (Face), also known as Judgement, is the "true self" of Benikage. She believes in justice, liberty, and all sorts of other things that would define the typical "hero". She has also quit the secret organisation she once worked for, an act punishable by death.
 Candy Cane (Rebecca Welsh) (Heel) sings lead vocals of the all girl punk band The Killer Barbies. Society has labeled her a misfit and a punk, but in reality, she has a pure heart. She entered Rumble Roses in order to win the prize money and to save the orphanage where she was raised. She plays truant from school in order to do this.
 Becky (Face) is the alter ego of Candy Cane. She is a typical cheery cheerleader. Miss Spencer convinced Candy Cane to go back to school, and Candy soon joined the cheerleading squad. She uses this to her wrestling advantage, as many of her attacks and moves focus on various cheerleading stunts.
 Dixie Clemets (Face) is the only daughter of a prominent Texan ranch owner. Dixie helps out with the family ranch while also working at the local sheriffs' office. She decided to try her hand at Rumble Roses when she found out that the daughter of her idol, the legendary wrestler Kamikaze Rose, entered the tournament. She uses the game's theme song as her own.
 Sgt. Clemets (Heel) is her alter ego after performing various "fouls", which resulted in fans "booing" her. She then became a cop, though with her changed attitude, became a rather "crooked" cop.
 Evil Rose (Fujiko Hinomoto) (Heel) is a feared masked wrestler who is known for her very rough tactics. She has superhuman reflexes and agility, which she uses to full advantage while torturing her opponents. She has in depth knowledge of Reiko and Lady X.
 Noble Rose (Face) is the alter ego of Evil Rose. Like Yasha, Noble Rose believes in things that define the typical hero. Noble Rose is aware that she is, in fact, Reiko's sister. And she also knows the fate of their mother. She never reveals either of these secrets to Reiko.
 Lady X Substance (N/A) is an artificial being made from the genetic codes of the famous Japanese female wrestler Kamikaze Rose. She is a cyborg, as sufficient portions of her are mechanical. Lady X was created by Anesthesia to alter the military balance on a global scale and to plunge the world into fear and suffering. Noble Rose is aware that Lady X was once her and Reiko's mother, but keeps this secret to herself.
 Lady X Subsistence (N/A) is the alter ego of Lady X Substance. Though there really isn't any noticeable change, Lady X Subsistence is exactly identical to Lady X. However, Lady X Subsistence is in her true "cyborg" form. She has unique moves and taunts that demonstrate that she is a cyborg, e.g. firing her fist like a projectile to hit an opponent who is out of reach.
  (Face) is child prodigy of Judo. She has elite status as a judo practitioner, but yearns to avenge her loss in her childhood at the hands of another girl. She joins Rumble Roses when she finds out the other girl entered. Unlike the other characters, she is very shy and is uncomfortable with being viewed as a "beautiful woman".
 The Black Belt Demon, or The BBD (Heel) is the alter ego of Makoto Aihara. With amazing strength and skill, she hopes to win Rumble Roses again, but she is purely possessed. She wishes to kill Reiko and Aigle, her best friends and greatest rivals. Her personality is almost entirely different from before.
 Muriel Spencer (Face), referred to as Miss Spencer, is a history teacher who joins Rumble Roses in order to drag her most rebellious student, Rebecca Welsh, back to school.
 Mistress Spencer (Heel) is a dominatrix version of Miss Spencer, though they both have different personalities. To go with her dominatrix gimmick she has a "slave", a flamboyant man in clown make-up named Sebastian. She begins all matches with a riding crop in hand.
  (Face) is a girl that loves competition and is not afraid to show it. She respects her opponents, her mother's legacy as a legendary wrestler, and often prays to her before and after a match. She enters the sport after her mother and sister go missing. She never learns that they are both in the tournament.
 Rowdy Reiko (Heel) is her alter ego after she joins a group of bikers who called themselves The Road Warriors. Reiko became their leader, and was given the name Queen Cobra. She denies being Reiko, saying she has killed her.

In the online mode included with the Subsistence re-release of Metal Gear Solid 3: Snake Eater, a game setting allowed the highest scoring player on each team to play as either Reiko Hinomoto for red team or Rowdy Reiko for blue after the first round was over and points were totaled. These players had modified CQC attacks in which Reiko would perform her signature "Sunrise Suplex" move on their opponent.

Rumors that Sebastian the Clown, the Bear and Aisha's dancers can be unlocked as playable characters are incorrect. While they do have full models on the game disc they were never made to be used in matches. It is possible with hacking to replace preset characters with them, but they will retain all of the attributes, moves, etc. of the character they replaced.

Regional Differences
There are many regional differences between the North American and Japanese releases of Rumble Roses. 

 In the Japanese release, there is a Tutorial mode available for those new to the game. The North American release of Rumble Roses does not have a tutorial mode available. 
 Both releases of Rumble Roses contain a Gallery mode where the characters can be viewed in a Locker Room or Beach, however in the Japanese release there are two other Galleries available where you can view artwork, and movies, while the Locker Room and Beach part of the gallery mode are labeled, "Personal". 
 In the Japanese release of Rumble Roses, one of the characters, Bloody Shadow and her face counterpart, Judgment, have their character roster animations switched from the North American release of the game. Bloody Shadow now has the same animation on the character roster as Reiko and Sgt. Clemets, while Judgment has Bloody Shadow's unique animation. 
 In the Japanese release of Rumble Roses you have the options to change the language to either English or Japanese and switch captions on or off. Changing the language can have many different effects to the Japanese release of Rumble Roses, aside changing the character voices along with changing the subtitles and some of the in game text. 
 When the game is set to Japanese in the Japanese release of Rumble Roses, one of the characters, Bloody Shadow along with her face counterpart, Judgment, have their names changed. Bloody Shadow is now called, "Benikage" and Judgment is now called, "Yasha" in the Japanese setting of the Japanese release of Rumble Roses. 
 Bloody Shadow's theme music after you win a match with her will now have lyrics, while there are no lyrics present at all in the North American release of Rumble Roses or when the game's language is set to English.
 Reiko's theme, "Look to the Sky" will have lyrics sung in Japanese when the game's language is set to Japanese which also changes the meaning of the song to fit Reiko's personality and story, but the lyrics will be sung in English when the language settings are in English or in the North American release of Rumble Roses. The English lyrics in Reiko's theme music will also have a different meaning, with the lyrics more so being about a break up between a couple. The song, "Look to the Sky" in English was also a song from a game called Dance Dance Revolution 5th Mix also named, "Look to the Sky". 
 Aisha's theme music in the Japanese language settings will have the lyrics in sung Japanese, while in the English settings or North American release of Rumble Roses, will have the lyrics sung in English instead. 
 Makoto has theme music that is only exclusive to the Japanese release of Rumble Roses when the language settings are in Japanese called, "My First Season" by Ayana Kawano. When the Japanese release of Rumble Roses has the language settings switched to English or in the North American release a different musical track plays for Makoto called, "Summer Memories" by Ayice. 
 There is one hidden exclusive character in the Japanese release of Rumble Roses named, Sebastian, the clown who is with Mistress in her intro. Sebastian uses the same animations and moves that are used by Mistress herself, and is available by holding down L1 while choosing Mistress specifically. When using Sebastian, you will also see Mistress' intro in Sebastian's viewpoint, more so the camera focusing on him in some shots. 
 In the Japanese release of Rumble Roses, you now can choose any locked face or heel character in the game without the need of using the Vow System to change the available characters by holding down R1 while picking your character. In the North American release you cannot choose any of the locked characters without using the Vow System.

Music
Rumble Roses Project feat. Teresa James - "Yankee Rose" (Dixie Clemets)
The Killer Barbies - "Have Some Fun" (Candy Cane)
Aisha - "FATE" performed (Aisha)
Aisha - "NO MORE" performed (Showbiz/Sista A)
Sota Fujimori feat. yoshiko - "Look At The Sky" (Reiko Hinomoto)
Akira Yamaoka - "Pluck The Roses!" (Evil Rose)
Akira Yamaoka - "I'm Too Virtuous" (Miss Spencer)
Sota Fujimori - "Whip Me Hard!" (Mistress Spencer)
Sota Fujimori - "The Cutter" (Dr. Cutter/Dr. Anesthesia)
Sota Fujimori - THE MECH;MOTHER (Lady X/Lady X Substance)
Peggy Woo - "B.E.C.K.Y." (Becky)
Yuka Kawahara - "Junction Rainy Blue" (Rowdy Reiko)
Yuka Watanabe - "The Spirit Hawk" (Aigle)
Chuji Nagoka - "The Imperial Carnival" (Killer Khan)
Michiru Yamane - "Immortal Revenger" (Judgement/Yasha)
Michiru Yamane - "The Thorn of Justice" (Noble Rose)
DJ TAKA - "The Shadow Appears" (Bloody Shadow/Benikage)
Ayice - "Summer Memories" (Makoto Aihara)
Des-ROW - "The Bitter Road" (The Black Belt Demon/The BBD)
Mutsuhiko Izumi - "Dice Away" (Sgt. Clemets)
DJ nagureo - "Keep on Liftin'" (Anesthesia)

Reception 

The game received "average" reviews according to video game review aggregator Metacritic.

Critics generally disliked the audio quality and plot but praised the graphics. J.M. Vargas's review for PSX Nation said: "Like too many Konami projects localized in English the voices in this game are utter and complete garbage". Jeremy Dunham reviewed the game for IGN, giving it 7.8 out of 10 overall: 9 in both Presentation and Graphics, 6.5 in Sound, 7.5 in Gameplay, and 7 in Lasting Appeal. Dunham found the storyline to be lackluster but enjoyed the game, commenting that "it's one of those rare games that manages to capitalize on the whole sex appeal thing without sacrificing the gameplay along with it". In an article for GamerFeed, Chris Buffa said that the "gorgeous women and environments will get your blood pumping" and the "corny dialogue only adds to the game's hilarity". In 2012, FHM included Benikage among the nine "sexiest ninja babes in games" and compared her to Jade Lopez.

Sequel

See also

List of licensed wrestling video games

References

External links
Official website 

2004 video games
3D fighting games
Konami franchises
Konami games
Multiplayer and single-player video games
PlayStation 2 games
PlayStation 2-only games
Professional wrestling games
Video games scored by Akira Yamaoka
Video games featuring female protagonists
Yuke's games
Video games developed in Japan